The Republican Party (PR) was a political party in Romania. In 1993 it merged with two other parties to create the Party of Social Democracy in Romania (PSDR), although some dissatisfied members created a party with the same name later the same year.

History
The Republican Party contested the 1990 general elections as part of the Alliance for Romanian Unity (AUR), a nationalist political alliance formed with the Romanian National Unity Party (PUNR). The alliance received 2.1% of the Chamber of Deputies vote, winning nine seats. It also received 2.2% of the Senate vote, winning two seats. However, all of the seats were taken by the PUNR. The Republican Party contested the 1992 general elections alone, receiving 1.6% of the Chamber vote and failing to win a seat.

Electoral history

Legislative elections

Presidential elections

References

Defunct political parties in Romania